Petar Ilić (born 28 April 1993) is a Serbian football forward.

Career
At the end of January 2019, Ilić left Zvijezda Gradačac.

References

External links
 
 Petar Ilić stats at utakmica.rs 
 

1993 births
Living people
Footballers from Novi Sad
Association football midfielders
Serbian footballers
FK Cement Beočin players
FK ČSK Čelarevo players
FK Donji Srem players
FK Proleter Novi Sad players
FK Borac Banja Luka players
FK Inđija players
Serbian First League players
Serbian SuperLiga players
NK Zvijezda Gradačac players
OFK Bečej 1918 players
Serbian expatriate footballers
Expatriate footballers in Bosnia and Herzegovina